Tayfield is a surname. Notable people with the surname include:

 Arthur Tayfield (1931–2022), South African cricketer 
 Hugh Tayfield (1929–1994), South African cricketer